Dordi may refer to:

People
 Alessandro Dordi, one of the Three Martyrs of Chimbote
 Dordi Nordby (born 1964), Norwegian curler
 Marcantonio Dordi (1598–1663), Italian painter, active in Bassano del Grappa

Places
 Dordi Rural Municipality, Nepal